This is a list of Croatian television related events from 1970.

Events

Debuts

Television shows

Ending this year

Births
22 March - Vlatka Pokos, Austrian-born TV host & singer
18 April - Barbara Kolar, TV & radio host
13 June - Mila Elegović, actress
15 July - Dražen Čuček, actor
26 August - Zoran Vakula, weatherman
10 November - Goran Navojec, actor

Deaths